Dolly is the sixteenth solo studio album by American entertainer Dolly Parton. It was released on September 15, 1975, by RCA Victor. To differentiate it from Parton's 2009 4-disc, career-spanning box set, which is also titled Dolly, the album is sometimes referred to as Dolly: The Seeker – We Used To.

Critical reception

Billboard published a review of the album in the issue dated September 27, 1975, calling the album "a collection of Dolly's favorite love songs. She wrote all of the tunes and is one of the better writers around. All beautiful songs, beautifully done." Billboard also named "Most of All Why", "Because I Love You" and "Only the Memory Remains" as the best cuts on the album.

In the October 4, 1975 issue, Cashbox said, "Produced and arranged by Porter Wagoner, this LP is a collection of love songs written by Dolly, most of them sad songs — songs of remembering lost love. Most are ballads with only a few uptempo cuts."

Commercial performance
The album peaked at No. 14 on the US Billboard Top Country Albums chart.

The album's first single, "The Seeker", peaked at No. 2 on the US Billboard Hot Country Singles chart and No. 105 on the US Billboard Hot 100. In Canada "The Seeker" peaked at No. 1 on the RPM Country Singles chart. The second single, "We Used To", peaked at No. 9 on the US Billboard Hot Country Singles chart and No. 4 on the Canadian RPM Country Singles chart.

Track listing

Personnel
Adapted from the album liner notes.
Herb Burnette - art director
Dennis Carney - photography
The Lea Jane Sigers - vocal accompaniment
Bill McElhiney - orchestration
The Nashville Edition - vocal accompaniment
Dolly Parton - lead vocals
Tom Pick - recording engineer
Roy Shockley - recording technician
Porter Wagoner - producer, arrangements

Charts
Album

Singles

References

Dolly Parton albums
1975 albums
RCA Records albums